Ronald Walter Ingram (July 5, 1933 – June 30, 1988) was a Canadian ice hockey defenceman and coach. He played 114 games in the National Hockey League for the New York Rangers, Chicago Black Hawks, and Detroit Red Wings between 1956 and 1965. The rest of his career, which lasted from 1953 to 1970, was spent in various minor leagues. After his playing career Ingram worked as a coach in various leagues, including with the San Diego Mariners and Indianapolis Racers of the World Hockey Association from 1975 to 1978.

Playing career
Born in Toronto, Ontario, Ingram played junior hockey with the Toronto Marlboros then moved onto senior hockey's Stratford Indians. He played 114 games in the National Hockey League for the New York Rangers, Chicago Black Hawks, and Detroit Red Wings between 1956 and 1965, often as a reliable midseason call-up. During that time, he also played extensively in the American Hockey League for the Cleveland Barons and then the Buffalo Bisons.

Ingram spent the later portions of his career solely in the minors, first with the Baltimore Clippers and then again with the Bisons.

Coaching career
After ending his playing career in 1970, Ingram became a coach, leading the Syracuse Blazers to 2 championships, one each in the Eastern Hockey League and the North American Hockey League. He also coached the San Diego Mariners, Indianapolis Racers, San Diego Hawks, and the US International University Gulls.

Career statistics

Regular season and playoffs

WHA coaching record

External links
 
 Obituary at LostHockey.com

1933 births
1988 deaths
Baltimore Clippers players
Buffalo Bisons (AHL) players
Canadian ice hockey defencemen
Chicago Blackhawks players
Cleveland Barons (1937–1973) players
Detroit Red Wings players
Indianapolis Racers
Montreal Royals (QSHL) players
North American Hockey League (1973–1977) coaches
Ontario Hockey Association Senior A League (1890–1979) players
Raiders/Golden Blades/Knights WHA franchise
Seattle Totems (WHL) players
Ice hockey people from Toronto
Toronto Marlboros players
United States International Gulls men's ice hockey coaches
World Hockey Association coaches